Violin is the final novel of the film trilogy "Witnesses". The film opens at the beginning of the 20th century in a violin shop, where an instrument was created as a present for a Jewish boy. Later that violin became a witness to the tragic events that took place during the Holocaust. When the instrument turned a hundred years old, its journey ended a concert at the Wailing Wall.

Plot 
The world of the film forms around a unique musical instrument and its incredible journey, that involved witnessing all the horrors of the war. It opens in a violin shop, where at the beginning of the 20th century an instrument was created as a present for a Jewish boy. It ends many years later by a concert at the Wailing Wall.

Cast 
 Lenn Kudrjawizki as Leonid Shtiller
 Vladimir Koshevoi  as Leo Shtiller
 Mikhail Gorevoy as Richard
 Vyacheslav Chepurchenko as Kurt
 Maria King as Rachel
 Maria Zykova as Ada
 Alex A. Petruhin as Otto
 Anzhelika Kashirina as Katya
 Alim Kandur as Shlomo
 Vyacheslav Ganenko as Moshe

Production 
Filmmakers from Russia, Israel, the United States, Belarus and the Czech Republic participated in the production. The filming took place in Moscow, New-York, Prague, Brest, Minsk and ended in Jerusalem with accordance of the novel's plot.

The film was created with the financial support of the Ministry for Culture of Russia, as well as private philanthropists.

Confession 
Film premiered as part of the competition program of the 39th Moscow International Film Festival in June 2017. It is also longlisted for the Academy Award for Live Action Short Film.

Accolades

Awards 
 39th Moscow International Film Festival, Competition program
 The film is longlisted for the Academy Award for Live Action Short Film, 2017
 The film was nominated for the Golden Eagle Award of National Academy of Motion Pictures Arts and Sciences of Russia for Best Short Film, 2017
 Sochi International Film Awards (Russia), the award of the name of Vera Glagoleva; the special award of the Short Film Contest "For the Preservation of Historical Memory"

Official partners 
 Federation of Jewish Communities of Russia
 Russian Jewish Congress
 Chabad Odessa

See also 
 Witnesses (2018 film)
 Shoes (2012 film)
 Brutus (2016 film)

References

External links 
 
 

Holocaust films
2017 films
2017 war drama films
Russian epic films
2010s Russian-language films
War epic films
Epic films based on actual events
Rescue of Jews during the Holocaust
Russian war drama films
2017 drama films
Russian World War II films